Les Crosbie (21 September 1914 – 14 October 2006) was an  Australian rules footballer who played with North Melbourne in the Victorian Football League (VFL).

Notes

External links 

1914 births
2006 deaths
Australian rules footballers from Victoria (Australia)
North Melbourne Football Club players
Northcote Football Club players